Twelve Hundred Times is Laura’s 4th Studio album.

Track listing
“Visitor” — 07:10
“This Grey Earth” — 05:06
“Gravity Hill” — 02:18
“Mark the Day” — 06:07
“Glint” — 02:44
“x1200” — 00:50
“Stone Seed” — 04:32
“Fugue State” — 02:28	
“The Slow” — 05:50	
“Safe Confinement” — 01:00	
“New Safe Confinement” — 05:55

External links 
 Twelve Hundred Times at Bandcamp (Official release website)

2011 albums